The Railways handball team is an Indian Handball team representing the Indian Railways in the HFI Men's National Handball Championship.

It is affiliated to Handball Federation of India.

Handball in India
Sport in Indian Railways